The 1928 United States presidential election in California took place on November 6, 1928 as part of the 1928 United States presidential election. State voters chose 13 representatives, or electors, to the Electoral College, who voted for president and vice president.

California voted for the Republican nominee, former Commerce Secretary Herbert Hoover, in a landslide over the Democratic nominee, New York Governor Al Smith. This was also the first election in California where the winning candidate received over 1 million votes. This also remains the last time that a Republican got more than 60% of the vote in California.

Results

Results by county

References

1928 California elections
California
1928